Mauritius competed at the 2004 Summer Paralympics in Athens, Greece. The team included 2 athletes, 1 man and 1 woman, but won no medals.

Sports

Athletics

Men's track

Women's track

See also
Mauritius at the Paralympics
Mauritius at the 2004 Summer Olympics

References 

Nations at the 2004 Summer Paralympics
2004
Paralympics